Mark Ridderhof (born April 25, 1989) is a retired Dutch professional basketball player. He played professionally since 2009, when he joined Landstede Basketbal. Since then, he played for Apollo Amsterdam and Donar Groningen in the Dutch Basketball League (DBL).

External links
Profile – Eurobasket.com

1989 births
Living people
Apollo Amsterdam players
Donar (basketball club) players
Dutch Basketball League players
Dutch men's basketball players
Landstede Hammers players
Shooting guards
People from Kampen, Overijssel
Sportspeople from Overijssel